Homi Bhabha Centre for Science Education (HBCSE) is a National Centre of the Tata Institute of Fundamental Research (TIFR), Mumbai, India. The broad goals of the institute are to promote equity and excellence in science and mathematics education from primary school to undergraduate college level, and encourage the growth of scientific literacy in the country. To these ends it carries out a wide spectrum of inter-related activities, which may be viewed under three broad categories:
 Research and development,
 Teacher orientation and science popularisation
 Olympiads and other students' nurture programmes

It is India's nodal centre for Olympiad programmes in mathematics, physics, chemistry, biology and astronomy. Another major program of HBCSE is the National Initiative on Undergraduate Science (NIUS).

HBCSE runs a graduate school in science and mathematics education. Students admitted to HBCSE Graduate School work for the degree of Ph.D. in Science Education, which is a degree of TIFR (Deemed University).

Notable staff

References

External links 
 
 Mathematics Education Research, HBCSE, Mumbai India
 Small Science - Homi Bhabha Curriculum for Primary Science
 Hindi Learning Portal - HBCSE
 National Initiative on Undergraduate Science - HBCSE
 Olympiad Programme - HBCSE, India
 Asian Science Camp - 2010
 International Physics Olympiad, 2015, India
 Collaborative Learning Portal, HBCSE

Tata Institute of Fundamental Research
Science education in India
Research institutes in Mumbai
Educational organisations based in India
1974 establishments in Maharashtra
Scientific organisations based in India
Education in Mumbai
Educational institutions established in 1974